The Maine Policy Institute, formerly the Maine Heritage Policy Center, is a conservative free-market think tank located in Portland, Maine. According to its mission statement, the Maine Policy Institute is "nonprofit, nonpartisan organization that conducts detailed and timely research to educate the public, the media, and lawmakers about public policy solutions that advance economic freedom and individual liberty in Maine." The organization has an associated media outlet, The Maine Wire.

Leadership
Matthew Gagnon is the CEO of Maine Policy Institute. The board includes Peter Anania, Timothy J. Bryant, W. R. Jackson, Jr., Jeff Kane, James Ward, Thomas Connolly, Laurence Rubinstein, Susan Dench, Jason Oney, Scott Wellman, Neal Freeman, and Jinger Duryea.

Activities
In 2006, Maine Policy Institute was prominently involved in the unsuccessful campaign for the Taxpayer Bill of Rights (TABOR) in Maine. In August 2011, Maine Policy Institute and the Maine chapter of Americans for Prosperity distributed a videotape produced by conservative activist James O'Keefe which "hint[ed] at" Medicaid fraud.

Maine Policy Institute has been involved in policy debates over issues such as government spending, welfare reform, and Maine's pension debt. The Bangor Daily News reported that critics of the organization have faulted Maine Policy Institute for publishing the salaries of state employees while declining to release the names of the organization's donors. MHCP is a member of the State Policy Network (SPN).

In 2013, Maine Policy Institute initiated a tax proposal for Maine's poorest area, Washington County. According to the proposal, "residents and businesses would cease to pay state income taxes or collect sales taxes until economic conditions reach the statewide average and stay there for three years running." A grant proposal supporting the initiative to was submitted to SPN.

Since 2013, Maine Policy Institute has published healthcare transparency data on the website CompareMaine.org. The website lists, by Maine hospital, how much different procedures cost for patients.

Maine Policy Institute has opposed the Common Core State Standards Initiative and called for the Maine Legislature to allow parents to opt their children out of standardized tests.

In 2014, Maine Policy Institute laid out an agenda for conservative policymaking in Maine. It included a push for welfare reform, making Maine a right-to-work state, a change in Maine's constitution to see the attorney general, secretary of state and state treasurer popularly elected, and tax cuts.

In 2016, the organization published its Piglet Book, a book chronicling wasteful government spending in Maine. The organization wrote that while Maine has made some progress, “state spending is still far larger than it should be, or would be if only Augusta took our spending seriously.” The Piglet Book had last been published in 2012.

Maine Policy Institute opposes ranked choice voting.

References

External links
 
 Organizational Profile – National Center for Charitable Statistics (Urban Institute)

Conservative organizations in the United States
Political and economic think tanks in the United States
Politics of Maine